Kal Mohammad Hoseyn (also Romanized as Kal Moḩammad Ḩoseyn and Kal Mohammad Hosein; also known as Kūlī Moḩammad Ḩoseyn) is a village in Howmeh-ye Sharqi Rural District, in the Central District of Ramhormoz County, Khuzestan Province, Iran. At the 2006 census, its population was 109, in 24 families.

References 

Populated places in Ramhormoz County